"El Amor Que Perdimos" (English: "The Love That We Lost") is a 2010 song by American singer Prince Royce. The song was released in January 2011 as the third single taken from Royce's debut studio album, Prince Royce (2010). It won the Lo Nuestro Award for Tropical Song of the Year.

Charts

Weekly charts

Year-end charts

Certifications

References

2011 singles
2010 songs
Prince Royce songs
Songs written by Prince Royce
Spanish-language songs
Top Stop Music singles